Symphyotrichum bullatum (formerly Aster bullatus) is a species of flowering plant in the family Asteraceae native to Mexico and Central America.

Citations

References

bullatum
Flora of Mexico
Flora of Central America
Plants described in 1894
Taxa named by Friedrich Wilhelm Klatt